Tyson Summers (born April 11, 1980) is an American college football coach. He is the defensive coordinator at Western Kentucky University, a position he had held since 2022. He previously served as an analyst at the University of Florida. Prior to that, Summers served as the defensive coordinator at the University of Colorado Boulder. Summers was the head football coach at Georgia Southern University from 2016 to 2017.

Playing career
A four-year letterwinner at Presbyterian College, Summers earned All-South Atlantic Conference honors as a linebacker in 1999 and was selected as team captain as a senior. He received his bachelor's degree in political science from Presbyterian in 2002.

Coaching career

Georgia Southern (HC)
2016
Head Coach for Georgia Southern; finished the season 5-7 after beginning the season 3-0.

2017
Loses to FCS - New Hampshire University. First time since 1994 that Georgia Southern lost to an opponent in a lower division. In 2015, The Georgia Southern Eagles led the nation in Rushing. As for 2017, they opened up the season being last (#130) for yards-per-play. On October 22, midway through the 2017 season, he was fired from his position as Head Coach after an 0-6 start to the season, with the college stating "the results on the field weren't where we needed them to be as we continue our growth as an FBS program." He was replaced by Chad Lundsford who performed much better than Summers.

Colorado State
2015
Defensive Coordinator under head Coach Mike Bobo.

UCF
2012–2014
Linebackers, Defensive Coordinator 
In his first full season at the DC level in 2014, Summers guided the top defense in the American Athletic Conference. UCF ultimately went 9–4 on the year with a spot in the Bitcoin St. Petersburg Bowl and back-to-back conference titles. Opponents averaged less than 300 yards per game (298.5), including six which posted less than 100 rushing yards and nine schools had less than 200 passing yards.

UAB
2011
Safeties/Co-Special Teams Coordinator
2007–10
Linebackers
Summers had been on UAB's staff since December 2006 as the Blazers' linebackers coach and was their safeties coach and co-special teams coordinator in the final season of his tenure.

In his first year working with the UAB safeties in 2011, Summers helped mentor Jamie Bender in his senior season as he led the Blazers with 119 tackles. Bender also posted 7.5 tackles for loss, two interceptions, six break-ups and four forced fumbles. He was voted on to the All-C-USA Second Team for that performance. On special teams, UAB ranked 17th in the nation by allowing just 4.71 yards per punt return, while freshman kicker Ty Long was named a 2011 Freshman All-American by Phil Steele's College Football Preview.

Summers took over UAB's linebackers in 2007, where Joe Henderson was named to the All-C-USA Second Team. In 2008, Henderson climbed up to the first team thanks to a team-high 87 tackles as well as 12.5 tackles for loss, and went on to play for the BC Lions of the CFL from 2010–11. With a new wave of linebackers under Summers' control in 2010, Marvin Burdette paced the Blazers with 114 tackles en route to All-C-USA Honorable Mention accolades. While Summers was with UAB, kicker Swayze Waters was an All-C-USA First Team pick in 2007 and 2008, and has appeared in NFL preseason games highlighted by a stint with the Pittsburgh Steelers in 2011.

Georgia Southern (Non HC)
2006
Safeties
Summers coached the safeties at Georgia Southern in 2006.

Georgia
2005
Graduate Assistant/Defensive Backs
Summers served as a graduate assistant for Georgia in 2005. That season the Bulldogs won the SEC title and earned a berth in the Sugar Bowl. Summers worked with the secondary and witnessed three UGA defensive backs get selected in the NFL Draft: Tim Jennings (second round, First-Team All-SEC), DeMario Minter (fifth round, First-Team All-SEC) and Greg Blue (fifth round, First-Team All-American).

Troy
2004
Graduate Assistant/Wide Receivers
During the 2004 season Summers was a graduate assistant at Troy, which reached the postseason and the Silicon Valley Classic.

Presbyterian
2003
Defensive Backs
In Summers 2003 helped guide the defensive backs at Presbyterian.

Tift County (Ga.) High School
2002
Assistant Coach/Defensive Backs
Summers earned his first coaching position at Tift County High School in Georgia where he was taking care of the defensive backs in 2002.

Head coaching record

References

1980 births
Living people
Colorado State Rams football coaches
Georgia Bulldogs football coaches
Georgia Southern Eagles football coaches
High school football coaches in Georgia (U.S. state)
People from Tifton, Georgia
Presbyterian Blue Hose football coaches
Presbyterian Blue Hose football players
Troy Trojans football coaches
UAB Blazers football coaches
UCF Knights football coaches